Maltby Main Football Club is a football club based in Maltby, Rotherham, South Yorkshire.

History
The club was established in 1916 as Maltby Main, with the players all working at Maltby Main Colliery. They joined the Sheffield Association League in 1919 when it restarted after World War I, and were runners-up in 1923–24 before winning back-to-back league titles in 1925–26 and 1926–27. In 1929 the club dropped into the Rotherham Minor League. They transferred to the Sheffield Amateur League in 1936 and were runners-up in their first season in the league, going on to win the championship play-off with a 2–1 win over Sheffield Training College. They returned to the Sheffield Association League in 1939, before moving to the Rotherham Association League in 1942, where they played until returning to the Sheffield Association League again in 1945.

In 1949 Maltby moved up to Division Two of the Yorkshire League. They finished bottom of the division in 1950–51, 1951–52 and 1952–53 and again in 1954–55, after which the club dropped into the Rotherham Association League for one season before withdrawing from all competitions in 1956–57. They returned to the Rotherham Association League in 1957, before joining Division Three of the Doncaster & District Senior League the following year. A third-place finish in their first season in the league saw the club promoted to Division Two. In 1959 the club were renamed Maltby Miners Welfare. In 1960–61 they finished fourth in Division Two and were promoted to Division One, and in 1963–64 the club were league champions. They transferred to Division Two of the Sheffield Association League in 1965, winning the division at the first attempt to secure promotion to Division One.

Maltby were relegated back to Division Two at the end of the 1967–68 season, having finishing second-from-bottom of Division One. The club subsequently folded in 1970, but were reformed in 1972 and joined Division Two of the Sheffield Association League. The following year saw the club rejoin the Yorkshire League, entering Division Three. They were Division Three runners-up in 1973–74 and were promoted to Division Two. A fourth-place finish in Division Two the following season saw the club promoted to Division One. However, they were relegated back to Division Two after a single season. Although the club were promoted again in 1979–80, they spent only a single season in Division One before being relegated again.

In 1982 the Yorkshire League merged with the Midland League to form the Northern Counties East League, with Maltby placed in Division One South. They were moved into Division One Central in 1984, before being placed in Division Two the following year amidst league reorganisation. Despite only finishing sixth in Division Two in 1985–86, the club were promoted to Division One. A fifth-place finish in 1989–90 saw them promoted to the Premier Division. They won the league's Presidents Cup in 1992–93. In 1996 the club reverted to their original name.

Maltby were relegated to Division One at the end of the 1999–2000 season. However, after finishing third in Division One in 2003–04, the club were promoted back to the Premier Division.

Season-by-season record

Ground

The club plays at Muglet Lane in Maltby. The ground has a capacity of 2,000, of which 150 is seated and 300 covered. The record attendance of 1,500 was set in June 1991 for a friendly match against Sheffield Wednesday.

List of managers

1979–????: Dick Habbin
1983-1984: Alan Turner
1985-1989: Richard 'Dick' Habbin
1989–1993: Colin Walker
1993–1994: Gary Waller
1994–1996: Richard Moon
1996–1998: Dave McCarthy
1998–1999: Steve Fleetwood
1999–2000: Glyn Kenny
2000: Paul Cavell
2000–????: Russ Eagle
2001–2002: Wilf Race
2002: Mark Smith
2002: Gary Kitching
2002–2005: Shaun Goodwin
2005–2006: Wilf Race
2006–2008: Sean Kay
2008: Robbie Barron
2008–2012: Steve Adams
2012–2013: Chris Dunn
2013: Brian Cushworth
2013–2015: Mick Norbury
2015–2017: Spencer Fearn

Honours
Northern Counties East League
Presidents Cup winners 1992–93
Doncaster & District Senior League
Division One champions 1963–64
Sheffield Association League
Champions 1925–26, 1926–27
Division Two champions 1965–66
Sheffield Amateur League
Champions 1936–37
Sheffield & Hallamshire Senior Cup
Winners 1977–78
Rotherham Challenge Cup
Winners 1928–29, 1935–36, 1962–63, 1963–64
Wharncliffe Charity Cup
Winners 1919–20 1964–65 1979–80 1980–81
Rotherham Charity Cup
Winners 1923–24, 1966–67, 1976–77, 1980–81, 1990–91, 2005–06
Mexborough Montagu Cup
Winners 1962–63, 1980–81

Records
Best FA Cup performance: Third qualifying round, 1924–25
Best FA Amateur Cup performance: Third qualifying round, 1946–47
Best FA Vase performance: Third Round, 1987–88, 1993–94
Record attendance: 1,500 vs Sheffield Wednesday, friendly, 1991–92

See also
Maltby Main F.C. players
Maltby Main F.C. managers

References

External links
Official website

 
Football clubs in England
Football clubs in South Yorkshire
Association football clubs established in 1916
1916 establishments in England
Sport in Rotherham
Sheffield & Hallamshire County FA members
Sheffield Association League
Sheffield Amateur League
Yorkshire Football League
Doncaster & District Senior League
Northern Counties East Football League
Mining association football teams in England